Nathaniel "Natty" Bumppo is a fictional character and the protagonist of James Fenimore Cooper's pentalogy of novels known as the Leatherstocking Tales.

Fictional biography 
Natty Bumppo, the child of white parents, grew up among Delaware Indians and was educated by Moravian Christians. In adulthood, he is a near-fearless warrior skilled in many weapons, chiefly the long rifle. He is most often shown alongside his Mohican foster brother Chingachgook and nephew Uncas.

Novels 

Bumppo is featured in a series of novels by James Fenimore Cooper collectively called the Leatherstocking Tales. The novels in the collection are as follows:

The tales recount significant events in Natty Bumppo's life from 1740 to 1806.

Aliases 

Before his appearance in The Deerslayer, Bumppo went by the aliases "Straight-Tongue", "The Pigeon", and the "Lap-Ear". After obtaining his first rifle, he gained the sobriquet "Deerslayer". He is subsequently known as "Hawkeye" and "La Longue Carabine" in The Last of the Mohicans, as "Pathfinder" in The Pathfinder, or The Inland Sea, as "Leatherstocking" (from which the series' title is drawn) in The Pioneers, and as "the trapper" in The Prairie.

Portrayal 

Bumppo has been portrayed most often in adaptations of The Last of the Mohicans. He was portrayed by Harry Lorraine in the 1920 film version, by Harry Carey in the 1932 film serial version, by Randolph Scott in the 1936 film version, by Kenneth Ives in the 1971 BBC serial, by Steve Forrest in the 1977 TV movie and by Daniel Day-Lewis in the 1992 film version.

Day-Lewis received a BAFTA Film Award nomination for Best Actor in 1993, won an Evening Standard British Film Award for Best Actor in 1993, and won an ALFS Award for British Actor of the Year in 1993 for his interpretation of the character. For the 1992 film, director Michael Mann changed the character's name to Nathaniel Poe, fearing audiences would laugh at "Natty Bumppo". The character is also portrayed as the adopted son of Chingachgook and brother of Uncas.

Adaptations of The Deerslayer have seen Bumppo played by Emil Mamelok in the 1920 film The Deerslayer and Chingachgook, by Bruce Kellogg in the 1943 film, by Lex Barker in the 1957 film, and by Steve Forrest in the 1977 TV movie.

Adaptions of The Pathfinder have seen Bumppo played by Paul Massie in the 1973 5-part BBC mini-series and Kevin Dillon in the 1996 TV movie.

Additionally, he was portrayed by Michael O'Shea in the 1947 film Last of the Redskins, George Montgomery in the 1950 film The Iroquois Trail, by John Hart in the 1957 TV series Hawkeye and the Last of the Mohicans, by Hellmut Lange in the 1969 German TV series Die Lederstrumpferzählungen, by Cliff DeYoung in the 1984 PBS mini-series The Leatherstocking Tales (which compressed The Deerslayer, The Last of the Mohicans, and The Pathfinder into four episodes), and by Lee Horsley in the 1994 TV series Hawkeye.

In popular culture

Fiction 
 Bumppo appears as a character in John Myers Myers' novel Silverlock (1949).
 The character Benjamin Franklin "Hawkeye" Pierce, from M*A*S*H, takes his nickname from the Native American name given to Natty Bumppo. In both the TV series and the original Richard Hooker novel on which it is based, it is stated that The Last of the Mohicans is the only book Pierce's father had ever read.
 Bumppo is known as Dan'l "Hawkeye" Bonner in Sara Donati's novel series, beginning with Into the Wilderness, meant as a sequel to The Leatherstocking books. The series centers on Hawkeye and Cora's son, Nathaniel Bonner.
 Bumppo is featured in the comic book series Jack of Fables, both in name and as "Hawkeye", along with Slue-Foot Sue (Pecos Bill's first wife).
 Bumppo is referred to in the graphic novel series The League of Extraordinary Gentlemen as being part of the 18th-century incarnation of the league.
 Near the end of Mississippi Jack, the fifth in the best-selling Bloody Jack series of female adventures by L.A. Meyer, an adopted white Shawnee called Lightfoot, a rifleman who always travels with his native Shawnee "brother", reveals his white surname to be "Bumpus" in an obvious tribute to Cooper's Natty Bumppo. Thinly veiled or unveiled characters from the history and culture of the time of the Leatherstocking novels is a repeating feature of the Bloody Jack book series.
 The Marvel Comics character Hawkeye takes his name from Natty Bumppo, whom he portrayed during his time as a carnival marksman before becoming a superhero.
 The character Gus Brannhard adopts a Fuzzy and names him Natty Bumppo in H. Beam Piper's novel Fuzzies and Other People.
Song of the Mohicans, written by Paul Block (Bantam Books, 1985), is a direct sequel to Last of the Mohicans. Taking up the story a few days after Uncas' death and burial, it recounts the adventures of Hawkeye and Chingachgook as they travel north to discover the connection between an Oneida brave and the Mohican tribe, and whether a sachem truly holds the key to the ultimate fate of the Mohicans.
 Natty Bumppo is featured in the Marvel comic Deadpool Killustrated, as part of a group of time-traveling heroes (Beowulf, Hua Mulan, and Sherlock Holmes and his partner Dr. Watson), intent on stopping Deadpool from killing all literary characters.
 Tinker, a major character in Amor Towles' novel, Rules of Civility, wants to be Natty Bumppo for the day.
 There is an intelligent dog named Natty Bumppo in John Brunner's novel "Shockwave Rider".
 Natty Bumppo appears as a character in Diana Gabaldon's eighth Outlander series novel, Written in My Own Heart's Blood.
Natty Bumppo, referred to as “Nasty” Bumppo, makes an appearance in Thomas King’s 1993 novel Green Grass, Running Water, in a scene in which he is sets out to kill Old Woman, whom he calls “Chingachgook.”
Natty Bumppo, referred to also as Davey Shipman, is a character in Lauren Groff's novel The Monsters of Templeton, along with Chingachgook and James Franklin Temple, a version of the author James Fenimore Cooper.
Natty Bumppo is referenced as a nickname in Leif Enger's Peace Like A River.

Mascots 
University of Iowa's mascot, the Hawkeye was taken from The Last of the Mohicans novel.

Music 
Natty Bumppo was the name of several pop music bands in the 1970s, including bands from Dayton, Ohio, and central Utah.

People 
Natty Bumppo is the name of the author of The Columbus Book Of Euchre and House Of Evil.

Postage stamps 
In 1989, the Soviet Union issued a series of postage stamps depicting themes of Cooper's The Leatherstocking Tales.

Sculptures and memorials 

The Lederstrumpfbrunnen (Leatherstocking fountain) in Edenkoben (Germany) contains a life-sized statue of Natty Bumppo
The British sculptor Thomas Nicholls designed a wooden sculpture of Natty Bumppo as part of an ensemble of six figures of American literature. The ensemble belongs to the interior design of Two Temple Place, London.

Media 
 In Total War: Warhammer II the Skaven unit roster features a specialty unit named Natty Buboe’s Sharpshooters, who utilize long rifles to fire projectiles at an exceptionally long range. This unit also appeared on the tabletop in Warhammer Armies: Skaven (7th Edition).

References

Further reading 
 Colin A. Clarke, "Like a Mirror Reflecting Itself: Natty Bumppo, The Virginian, and the Fate of the American Frontier," Presented at the 11th Cooper Seminar, James Fenimore Cooper: His Country and His Art at the State University of New York College at Oneonta, July 1997.
 David Leverenz, "The Last Real Man in America: From Natty Bumppo to Batman," American Literary History 1991 3(4):753–781. (caution: article requires money for full access)
Warren S. Walker: Plots and characters in the fiction of James Fenimore Cooper. Archon Books, 1978

External links 
 "Hawkeye (Character) from The Last of the Mohicans (1992)," The Internet Movie Database

Characters in American novels of the 19th century
Drama film characters
Fictional characters from New Jersey
Fictional explorers
Fictional hunters
James Fenimore Cooper
Literary characters introduced in 1823
Orphan characters in literature
Male characters in literature
Fictional people from the 18th-century